Bjørn Bjørnson (15 November 1859 – 14 May 1942) was a Norwegian stage actor and theatre director.

Biography
He was born in Christiania, the son of author Bjørnstjerne Bjørnson and his wife Karoline Bjørnson. In 1876, he was admitted as a student at the Stern Conservatory operated by Julius Stern in Berlin, Germany. He also attended the Vienna Conservatory.

He was the artistic leader of Christiania Theatre from 1885 to 1893, and he was the first theatre director at the National Theatre, from its opening in 1899 until 1907, and again from 1923 to 1927. Besides being an actor and director, he also was a playwright.
 
In 1893 he married Norwegian opera singer Gina Oselio. Their marriage was dissolved in 1909.

Selected works

Plays
 Moppy og Poppy (with M. O. Hansson), (1885)
 Johanne, (1898)
 Solen skinner jo  (1913)
 En tørst kamel, (1919)

Books
Vom deutschen Wesen: Impressionen eines Stammverwandten 1914-1917, (1917)
Mit livs historier. Fra barndommens dage, (1922)
Bjørnstjerne Bjørnson. Hjemmet og vennene. Aulestad-minner, (1932)
Bare ungdom, (1934
Det gamle teater. Kunsten og menneskene, (1937)

References

External links

Other sources
Rønneberg, Anton (1974)  Nationaltheatret, 1949-1974 (Gyldendal)   
Marker, Frederick J. and Lise-Lone Marker  (1996) A History of Scandinavian Theatre  (Cambridge University Press) 
Murer, Annette with Julian Garner translator (1977) The National Theatre of Norway (Boksenteret)   

1859 births
1942 deaths
Norwegian theatre directors
Norwegian male stage actors
Male actors from Oslo
Burials at the Cemetery of Our Saviour